The following is a list of characters from the manga series A.I. Love You written by Ken Akamatsu.

Main characters

Born June 5, 1978
Hitoshi is a freshman high-school student (in 1994) at Menjō (綿城) High School who underachieves at school both physically and academically.  One of his few strengths is his ability to program, and create artificial intelligences, and he eventually created programs Twenty and Thirty - programs so real that conversations with them are indistinguishable from conversation with normal girls.

Through a series of freak lightning accidents, both programs are transferred to the real world, and become a greater part of the life of Hitoshi.

Activated April 6, 1994
Saati is the thirtieth A.I. program Hitoshi created, and is the first program that Hitoshi really liked.

Through a freak lightning accident, she is transferred to the real world, and becomes Hitoshi's live-in girlfriend. In the real world she takes the family name , which is properly pronounced nanpa ("whirlpool"). In Japanese naming order her name, Namba Saati, is based on the English pronunciation of "Number Thirty" (Nanbā Sāti).

A kind girl, size data 82-58-85 cm (32¾"-23"-34") with thick eyebrows (A trait Akamatsu admitted to liking on women, citing Sae Isshiki as an example), and a bit naive, which does lead to frequent problems with Hitoshi. The most notable of which is that when she cooks meals she has the tendency to make them look exactly like the picture, regardless of the taste (having no taste buds), using everything from paint to colored markers until she receives a program upgrade that allows her to taste. She loves Hitoshi and is very loyal and supportive of him.

While she is sweet and kind, she is similar to the Love Hina character Naru Narusegawa (whom she resembles) and Negima! Magister Negi Magi character Asuna Kagurazaka in that she beats up Hitoshi if he does something perverted.

Hitoshi based her appearance on his mother.

Activated June or July 1994
Toeni (or "Toni" in the Tokyopop translation) is Hitoshi's A.I. Program No. 20 (Nanbā Tōenī "Number Twenty"). He based her face on Kimika Aso, the breasts on Reiko Satou, her butt on Ai Iijima, and her legs on Chisato Moritaka, giving her the measurements of 86-59-88 cm (34½"-23½"-35"). However, despite the fact she worked, she teased him a little too much, and though the teasing was good-natured he couldn't handle it in addition to the pressures of school, so he stored her away. When she comes into the story, she immediately tries to seduce Hitoshi and attempts to force Saati to leave but her efforts ultimately fail and she gives up on him. Her personality is incredibly shallow throughout most of the series. As the conclusion of the series approaches, however, her personality changes to that of a comforting big sister for Saati and Forty. This change is also apparent in her facial expression, which becomes progressively softer.

Due to another freak lightning accident Toeni is also brought into the real world, where she too stays with Hitoshi just like Saati (who refers to Toeni as onee-sama, the Japanese term for "big sister").

Forty is Hitoshi's A.I. Program No. 40 (Nanbā Fōti "Number Forty"), and the first he brought to life on purpose (sort of). Created using both C and Assembly Language, he/she is more powerful than Saati and Toeni combined. Saati and Toeni sneaked a before-it-was-ready look at this new A.I., agreed on an age, twelve, and then argued about the gender and personality and pressed too many buttons at once. The end result was an A.I. that had two modes: a male personality and a female personality within a female body. When Forty-kun, the boy, said "girl", he became Forty-chan, the girl; when Forty-chan said "boy", she became Forty-kun.  While each has presumably heard of the other's existence there are only two instances shown in which Forty-chan has some consciousness of Forty-kun; mostly each is blithely unaware of the other.

Forty-kun describes himself as a hard-line conservative who is not interested in Hitoshi's porn-based hobbies, an anal-retentive neat-freak, a self-righteous good boy, with a taste for the nicer things in life - Saati's personality choice. Forty-chan describes herself as sensual party girl with a taste for the wild side of things, even going so far as to seduce Hitoshi by using a Hyper Program Option to give herself a more mature body - Toeni's personality choice. Saati wanted a nice little sister, and Toeni wanted a naughty little brother; they got a naughty little sister and a nice little brother.

Forty-kun got it into his head that he wanted to go to school, so he was enrolled in class 1-C in what looks like Jr. High and, convenient for the manga artist, located in the same building as Hitoshi and Saati's High School.

Ken Akamatsu has said that Forty-chan became a character model for Kaolla Su from Love Hina.

Other characters

Kimika, the smartest and prettiest girl in school, is adored by Hitoshi to the point where he makes Toeni, who is almost identical in physical appearance to Kimika apart from looking about five years older and having much larger breasts. She never gives Hitoshi any consideration, playing a trick on him at the beginning of the series, she also serves as the antagonist to the group in Volume 1, and in two chapters of volume 2.

Math and homeroom teacher of Hitoshi Kōbe.  He is seen in the first chapter being severe towards Hitoshi and appears several more times in much the same role.  His name is mentioned in the fourth chapter.  A character named Nitta-sensei, looking like an older version of this character, appears in Mahō Sensei Negima.

A boy who single-handedly guards Kujūkuri Beach from litterbugs. To avoid getting hurt any more by Makoto's booby traps, Hitoshi and Saati help him collect every soft drink can buried in the sand (in and out of the water) - 138,652 in total - which Makoto cashes in to build a special watchtower to guard the beach better.

A skilled computer programmer/hacker who spent some time in his past in the USA producing operating systems. He was the main antagonist of Volume 3. He spends much of his time producing computer viruses such as the Peter4 Trojan horse virus that infected Saati and the Spider Virus in the Zero Arc (Program.53-55). He has been involved in criminal enterprises such as pyramid schemes. More recently he has become obsessed with the "reality module" by which A.I. programs can come to life, and used to bring a fire-breathing dragon (which he named Xenobia) to life. The handle "Billy-G" is a take-off on Bill Gates.

A.I. Program No. 31
Billy-G's version of Saati created from a back-up file when he captured her in Volume 3. She appears in Volume 8.

A school newspaper reporter in Hitoshi's high school who wears glasses to read because she is far-sighted. Actually she's a pretty girl without them. She became suspicious of Hitoshi and Saati when she just missed seeing Saati come out of a computer screen. Sensing that it is a big scoop she spied on them both in school and at their residence. She dropped her story on them when she was saved from an underwear thief by Hitoshi, Saati, and Toeni.  She is seen in two other chapters too.

Hitoshi's paternal cousin who lives in Aomori; she refers to Hitoshi as onii-san ("big brother"). She is an excellent skier and helps her father to run a hot-springs resort. Growing up she was very much a tomboy and she and Hitoshi would play often such as 'Doctors and Nurses', in which case she took on the Doctor role. She used to have a crush on Hitoshi since he wanted to marry her when they grew up - even having a sense of rivalry with Saati - but now sees Hitoshi and Saati as the resort's "honeymoon couple".

She is based on Ken Akamatsu's actual cousin, Kikuko.

A.I. Program No. 29
Saati's previous incarnation until a bug in her linguistics program caused her to be shut down, 80% of Twenty-Nine's programming went into making Saati. When Toni accidentally materialized her, Twenty-Nine, easily mistaken for Saati, went on a minor crime rampage until found attempting to expose herself to a group of middle-aged men. She attempted to pass herself off as Saati until Toeni and Hitoshi picked the real one; like all programs except Saati, she had zero modesty while Saati had modesty to spare.

Twenty-Nine is currently stored away on a 5¼-inch floppy disk with all the previously errant programs.

A.I. Program No. 28
An in-joke character, recognizable as a parody of Tetsujin 28-go.

Forty-kun's homeroom teacher and the object of his first crush. Considered popular and gorgeous by most of the male students, she is: 26 years old; single; 88-57-87; 5'2"; ; her favorites foods are tofu burgers, shave ice, and hard-boiled eggs; her favorite flower is the rose; and she's terrified of spiders.

Everyone, Forty-kun especially, was crushed when they discovered she was secretly engaged to Ken'ichi Nakamura (NAKAMURA Ken'ichi) the P.E. teacher.  The custom, still prevalent in the mid-1990s, was that a woman leaves the work-force when she marries.  Thus Takemoto-sensei put off her marriage, put off her resignation and kept her engagement-to-marry secret until the last day of the school term. Forty-chan managed to bid farewell to Forty-kun's first love for him.

A library representative in Hitoshi's high school who is referred to as the "Madonna of the Library"; her shy and quiet nature compliment her 90-cm (36") D-cup bust. Not very good at computers, she tricks Hitoshi and Saati into infecting the school database with a virus she mocked up. When Saati defeats the virus, which plumped up the measurement data of every girl in school to D-cups, Yūko admits she is really a 78-cm (31") A-cup who padded twelve centimeters (5") to her chest to gain the attention of boys, and needed to overwrite her official measurement data to avoid being found out.

Three girls from class 2-D whose names are identifiable inside the school's system when Saati and Hitoshi accidentally implant, then remove, Yūko's breast-enlargement virus. Misato is 164 cm (5'5½") and 50 kg (110 lbs); Aki is 168 cm (5'7") and 53 kg (117 lbs); and Ryōko is 156 cm (5'2½") and 50 kg (110 lbs).

A widow living with her child's family in Nerima, Sayo once worked as a first-grade teacher at Jinjō Elementary School in Nagano since 1926, but it was closed down in 1945 before she could hand out her last class' graduation diplomas. When she learned that the school was scheduled to be demolished, she started an online diary in order to find her last students or allow them to find her. Unfortunately, she died in February 1996 before she could do so; fortunately, Hitoshi came across it one month later while looking for more explicit online diaries.

Her diary address accidentally downloaded onto a floppy disk that Hitoshi gave to Saati to back up her memory, Saati became "possessed" by Sayo's "ghost". They discovered the identity of Saati's "previous life", Sayo's granddaughter ( Her name is unmentioned in the manga ), the school, the diplomas, and the students, now grandparents themselves. Sayo, bearing an uncanny resemblance to Saati, thanked Saati for putting her spirit to rest before she was purged from Saati's memories.

Another ghost named Sayo appears in Ken's later work, Mahō Sensei Negima.

The fraudulent owner/operator of the Yamazaki Dieters' Spa Resort in Izu that Toyotomi Hideyoshi allegedly visited during the Muramochi period. When Saati, Toeni, and Hitoshi found they had put on weight, Chitose took their money for ridiculously half-brained weight-loss plans, and ran.

The president of Namako computer game company that employs Hitoshi and the girls when Toeni spends all their money (again). Hitoshi becomes a programmer for their latest game, Fighting Dolls '96, while the girls are dressed up as the three female characters. When Toeni accidentally deletes the game's unsaved data, putting Hitoshi into a severe work/schedule bind, she comes up with a plan for them to enter the computer to become the characters for a trade show. The good news is that nobody, including Namako himself, noticed anything unusual; the bad news is Hitoshi still had to rewrite all the data that was erased, except better to match what was presented at the trade show.

Cynthia (or "Cindy") is a Japanese-American teen idol who ran away from home to her mother's homeland because of her dysfunctional relationship with her father, the CEO of IBN. She was attempting to buy the most expensive PC in a computer store in Akihabara ( ¥3,128,000 ) when Hitoshi recommended a simpler model. Choosing Hitoshi as her computing teacher, Soon after he helps her with her phobia, she develops romantic feelings for him and flirts with him in front of Saati to the point of an tug-of-war that knocks him out cold. When they learn that Cindy wants to overcome her acute technophobia in order to write a combined apology/birthday e-mail, both of them help her finish the job, with Saati becoming the "computer fairy" in order to find her father's e-mail address.

Three students from Hitoshi's class seen during rehearsals for their school festival play, The Little Mermaid, in Volume 7. Their surnames are identified by name-tags on their gym clothes, Nakanishi and Yamaguchi are the boys' surnames, Mizuki is the girl's.  Hitoshi went to the homes of Tooru Nakanishi and of Yamaguchi on Christmas Eve 1995 in Volume 5.

 and 
Hitoshi's self-proclaimed "beautifully developed and big-breasted little sister". Younger than him by two years, she is loud and energetic, and has a few psychological problems (that of wanting to grab any woman's breast, especially if they are big) and possibly, even a brother-complex. Like Hitoshi she is a talented programmer and has developed her own A.I. program, named "Ma-kun", whom she wears around her neck inside a tamagotchi. Ma-kun has a very calm, cool and collected personality. It is indirectly implied that Toeni and he continue on to have a relationship after the conclusion of the series as she is seen wearing him around her neck in the final chapter, and in the epilogue.

A.I. Program No. Zero
Zero is an A.I. program and the antagonist of Volume 8. Zero appears as a young teen male and is also known as "Spider-Zero" after Program Zero was infected with the Spider virus.  Zero is also an artificial construct and bears a striking resemblance to Fate from Mahō Sensei Negima.

An epilogue to the story exists but appears to only be available on CD in Japanese in Japan.
epilogue

References

External links

A.I. Love You